Geoff Mahon (24 April 1915 – 16 February 1971) was an Australian rules footballer who played with Geelong in the VFL.

A ruckman, Mahon debuted for Geelong in 1936 and the following season was a reserve in their premiership side. He played for Geelong for five years before crossing to Victorian Football Association club Prahran without a clearance in 1941. He returned to Geelong in 1946 and won Geelong's best and fairest.

References

External links

1915 births
Geelong Football Club players
Geelong Football Club Premiership players
Prahran Football Club players
Carji Greeves Medal winners
Australian rules footballers from Victoria (Australia)
1971 deaths
One-time VFL/AFL Premiership players